Manuel Antonio de Jesus Alvarado (1919-2011) was a musician, conductor and music educator born in Guatemala. He studied harmony, composing and conducting and graduated as a cellist from the Guatemala National Music Conservatoire and received a master's in musical education (?) from the Royal Manchester College of Music. In 1970 he founded the Guatemala Youth Symphony, which he led until its dissolution in 2000. He was awarded the Francisco Marroquin Order from the government of Guatemala for his lifelong dedication to music education.

External links
 
 

Alumni of the Royal Manchester College of Music
1919 births
2011 deaths
Guatemalan musicians
20th-century Guatemalan people